The Eredivisie Player of the Month is an association football award that recognises the best adjudged Eredivisie player each month of the season.

The Eredivisie Player of the Month award is based on statistics (StatsPerform) and votes from football fans, cast via the KPN Man of the Match vote (ESPN). These elements also count towards the Eredivisie Player of the Year and Johan Cruijff Talent of the Year Awards, which are presented in a live broadcast on ESPN at the end of the season 2021–22. The Eredivisie Player of the Month vote is an initiative of the Eredivisie CV in collaboration with ESPN. 

Steven Berghuis, Davy Klaassen, Hakim  Ziyech, Frenkie de Jong, Orkun  Kökçü, Donyell Malen, Oussama Idrissi and Cody Gakpo have been Player of the Month the most with two awards each. Three players have won the award in consecutive months: Orkun Kökçü, Oussama Idrissi and Cody Gakpo. 

As of December 2022, the most recent recipient of the award is Utrecht player Taylor Booth.

Key 
 Players marked  shared the award with another player.
 Position key: GK – Goalkeeper; DF – Defender; MF – Midfielder; FW – Forward.

List of winners

Multiple winners

Awards won by nationality

Awards won by position

Awards won by club

References 

Eredivisie trophies and awards
Association football player of the month awards
Lists of Eredivisie players